Charlotte Cooper (born 1968) is a London-based British writer and outspoken advocate for gay rights and fat acceptance.

Biography
She describes herself as "queer,  from a working-class background, white, middle-aged, and have a load of higher education. I have poly relationships and am sort-of femme".  Cooper is both an academic and mainstream author. She has published articles in academic journals such as Disability and Society and is herself a board member of Fat Studies: An Interdisciplinary Journal of Body Weight and Society.  She has written many articles on fat acceptance and gay rights issues for websites, magazines and newspapers, including Diva, the UK's leading lesbian magazine, and UK national newspaper The Guardian. Cooper is also news editor for RainbowNetwork.com, the largest gay and lesbian portal in the UK. She is a prolific author of zines and performs in the queercore band Homosexual Death Drive.

Charlotte Cooper describes her approach to fat activism:I challenge biomedical discourse on fat through my activism. Many fat activists are interested in countering obesity discourse claims, but my interests are in creating communities and cultures, and in documenting fat activist histories, that are somewhat autonomous and exist beyond the boundaries of medicalisation... It does not answer to biomedical discourse, it is something else entirely that is built on the creativity and sheer badassery of fat people. It shows that there are other ways of thinking about fat, and embodying fatness.

Cooper's 2002 novel, Cherry, about a young woman's experience and discovery of lesbianism, attracted controversy when copies were impounded by Canadian Customs officers. Reasons given were the scenes of fisting and golden showers.

In 2007, Cooper coined the term "headless fatty" to describe negative media representations of fat people.

In 2010, Cooper was a Government of Ireland Ph.D scholar at Limerick University where she wrote a history of the fat activist movement in which she argued that it is closely allied with the feminist movement and, like it, has undergone waves of activity.

Cooper has co-produced a number of events with fat activism themes including 'The Fat of the Land', 'Big Bum Jumble' and 2012's 'Fattylympics', a protest against both attitudes to fat and the London 2012 Olympics, held in Stratford, where she lives.

Books 
 Fat and Proud: The Politics of Size (1998)
 Cherry (2002)
 Fat Activism: A Radical Social Movement (2016)
 Fat Activist Vernacular (2019)

Journal articles

See also
Fat acceptance movement
Fat feminism

References

External links
 Official website

1968 births
21st-century British novelists
British lesbian writers
Living people
English LGBT rights activists
Fat acceptance activists
English LGBT novelists
British women novelists
21st-century British women writers
Polyamorous people
21st-century LGBT people